is a railway station on the Tsugaru Railway Line in the town of Nakadomari, Aomori, Japan, operated by the private railway operator Tsugaru Railway Company.

Lines

Station layout
The station has one side platform serving a single bidirectional line. There is no station building, but only a weather shelter on the platform. The station is unattended.

History
Fukōda Station was opened on April 24, 1932. It was closed on April 1, 1943, but reopened again on May 20, 1955.

Surrounding area

See also
 List of railway stations in Japan

External links

 

Railway stations in Aomori Prefecture
Tsugaru Railway Line
Nakadomari, Aomori
Railway stations in Japan opened in 1932